Listia is a free online marketplace and mobile app for trading goods between individuals without using money. The platform has a system known as Listia credits to facilitate the trades. Users earn credits for giving away items they no longer need and can then use credits to get items that other users have listed. The marketplace uses an auction system where users bid on each other's items until the auction ends and the highest bidder wins. The user who listed the item then arranges for a pickup or ships the item directly to the winner.

History

Listia originally received funding of $15,000 from startup funding firm Y Combinator. Listia was launched on August 6, 2009. In October 2009, Listia received $400,000 in funding from Implistic Capital in an angel round with Adam Pearsall joining the board of directors. By 2010, the site passed the 1,000,000 auction mark and was named one of the top 100 websites of 2010 by PCMag.

In April 2011, Listia raised an additional $1.75M in funding from Andreessen Horowitz, SV Angel, and other investors. Listia announced that they had over 1 million registered users and listings in over 3,000 cities by January 2012. They also launched their Android and iPhone apps in early 2012.

On July 18, 2012, Listia launched their Rewards Store to allow users to get brand new electronics and other goods with their Listia credits from big online retailers. Led by General Catalyst, they raised $9 million in Series A funding in October 2013 to be used on developing their mobile apps.

In 2018, Listia added XNK, a new currency to their marketplace. The currency used the Ethereum blockchain and could be used in and outside of Listia. A total of 500 Million XNK was created, 6% reserved for existing Listia users, 30% sold via private presale, and two public capped presales, 32% retained by Listia, vested over 3 years, 32% allocated for distribution and incentivizing the network, released over 3 years.
As of December 2021, Listia ranked 276,106 among global websites according to Alexa Internet.

Services 
In 2009, Listia has created a system called Listia Credits to help facilitate trading on the site. Users earn credits during sign-up and then continue to earn more as they place items in the marketplace.  Purchasing credits is also an option, and is Listia's main business model. Users may also gain credits by leaving feedback, completing offers on the site, participating in promotions, and general courtesies.

Department of Labor investigation

Listia agreed to pay $190,546 in back wages and damages to 61 current and former employees after the Wage and Hour Division of the Department of Labor conducted an investigation.  The company violated the Fair Labor Standards Act's overtime, minimum wage, and record-keeping provisions.  Customer service employees were not paid overtime for hours worked beyond 40 in a week and in cases minimum wage.  Listia also misclassified some employees as exempt from overtime pay and considered others as volunteers.  The volunteers were not paid only given credits towards purchases on the company's website.

References

External links 
 

Internet properties established in 2009
Online auction websites of the United States